Mark Jacob LeVoir (born July 29, 1982, in Minneapolis, Minnesota) is a former American football offensive tackle. He was signed by the Chicago Bears as an undrafted free agent in 2006. He played college football at Notre Dame.

LeVoir has also been a member of the New England Patriots, and Baltimore Ravens.

Early years
LeVoir played tight end at Eden Prairie High School, near Minneapolis, where he was a Parade All-American and first-team USA Today All-American.

College career
LeVoir moved from tight end to the offensive line in 2001, his freshman year at Notre Dame. He started 37 consecutive games during the final three years of his college career.

Professional career

Chicago Bears
After signing with the Bears as an undrafted free agent on May 5, 2006, LeVoir was waived by the team on September 2, 2006, and re-signed to the team's practice squad the next day, where he spent the entire 2006 season. He was signed to a future contract on February 2, 2007, but was waived again by the team on September 2, 2007, and re-signed to the team's practice squad the next day.

St. Louis Rams
On November 13, 2007, the Rams signed LeVoir to their 53-man roster from the Bears' practice squad, and there LeVoir spent the remainder of the 2007 season before signing a future contract after the season. He was waived by the Rams on August 31, 2008.

New England Patriots
LeVoir was claimed off waivers by the Patriots on September 1, 2008. He was active for all 16 games in 2008, and started two games in place of injured right tackle Nick Kaczur.

On August 25, 2009, the Patriots signed LeVoir to a contract extension through 2011; the deal included a $400,000 signing bonus. He began the 2009 season on the Physically Unable to Perform list with a shoulder injury. He was activated on October 24, in Week 7. He was active for the final 10 games of the season, seeing time as the third offensive tackle on the field.

In 2010, LeVoir was active for six games, all as a reserve. He was released on August 17, 2011.

Baltimore Ravens
On August 20, 2011, LeVoir signed with the Baltimore Ravens. He was released on October 18.

Second stint with the Rams
LeVoir re-signed with the St. Louis Rams on October 26, 2011. He has since been released.

References

External links
New England Patriots bio
Chicago Bears bio
Notre Dame Fighting Irish bio

1982 births
Living people
People from Eden Prairie, Minnesota
Players of American football from Minneapolis
American football offensive tackles
Notre Dame Fighting Irish football players
Chicago Bears players
St. Louis Rams players
New England Patriots players
Baltimore Ravens players